Sam Hood Field was a soccer-specific stadium located in Huntington, West Virginia on the campus of Marshall University next to Joan C. Edwards Stadium. The stadium was built by and named for Marshall University alumnus and former head men's soccer coach Stephen M. "Sam" Hood.

The 1,500-seat stadium was built in 1995 and was home to the men's and women's soccer programs from Marshall. Prior to 1995 the teams played at Edwards Stadium and Fairfield Stadium.

Hoops Family Field at the new Veterans Memorial Soccer Complex, located on the site of the former Veterans Memorial Fieldhouse, opened in August 2013. The Chris Cline Athletic Complex, a $25 million indoor football practice facility, track, and physical therapy research center which opened in September 2014, sits on the former Sam Hood Field site.

External links
 Information at Marshall athletics

Soccer venues in West Virginia
Marshall Thundering Herd soccer
Buildings and structures in Huntington, West Virginia
Defunct soccer venues in the United States
Demolished buildings and structures in West Virginia
1995 establishments in West Virginia
Sports venues completed in 1995